True gobies were a subfamily, the  Gobiinae, of the goby family Gobiidae, although the 5th edition of the Fishes of the World does not subdivide the Gobiidae into subfamilies. They are found in all oceans and a few rivers and lakes, but most live in warm waters. Altogether, the Gobiinae unite about 1149 described species in 160 genera, and new ones are still being discovered in numbers.

Description and ecology
They are usually mid-sized to small ray-finned fishes; some are very colorful, while others are cryptic. Most true gobies are less than 10 cm (4 in) long when fully grown. The largest species Glossogobius giuris can reach up to 50 cm (20 in); the smallest known species as of 2010, Trimmatom nanus, is just about 1 cm in length when fully grown, making it one of the smallest vertebrates.

In many true gobies, the pelvic fins have grown together into a suction cup they can use to hold on to substrate. Most have two dorsal fins, the first made up from spiny fin rays, while the other has some spines in the front followed by numerous soft rays.

They are most plentiful in the tropical and subtropical regions, but as a group are almost cosmopolitan in marine ecosystems. A few species tolerate brackish water, and some – Padogobius and Pomatoschistus species – even inhabit fresh water. They are generally benthic as adults (the spawn can distribute widely by ocean currents), only Sufflogobius bibarbatus is noted to be quite pelagic throughout its life. Most inhabit some sort of burrow or crevice and are somewhat territorial. In some cases, they live in symbioses with unrelated animals, such as crustaceans.

The larger species are fished for food, in some cases on a commercial scale. Many Gobiinae species are popular aquarium fish. Especially popular are the colorful species, some of which are regularly traded. In general, the interesting behavior and bold habits make most true gobies seem attractive pets. However, their territoriality and because even the smallest species are fundamentally carnivorous and need living food to thrive make them not easy to keep (particularly compared to the related family Eleotridae). As typical for oceanic fishes, many Gobiinae tend to be almost impossible to breed in captivity, and some species have become rare from habitat destruction and overfishing.

Genera
This subfamily contains about 160 genera and 1120 species:

 Aboma
 Acentrogobius
 Afurcagobius
 Akko
 Amblyeleotris
 Amblygobius
 Amoya	
 Anatirostrum
 Ancistrogobius
 Antilligobius
 Aphia
 Arcygobius
 Arenigobius
 Aruma
 Asterropteryx
 Aulopareia
 Austrolethops
 Babka
 Barbulifer
 Barbuligobius
 Bathygobius
 Benthophiloides
 Benthophilus
 Bollmannia
 Bryaninops
 Buenia
 Cabillus
 Caffrogobius
 Callogobius
 Caspiosoma
 Chriolepis
 Chromogobius
 Corcyrogobius
 Coryogalops
 Coryphopterus
 Cristatogobius
 Croilia
 Cryptocentroides
 Cryptocentrus
 Crystallogobius
 Cryptopsilotris
 Ctenogobiops
 Deltentosteus
 Didogobius
 Discordipinna
 Dotsugobius 
 Drombus
 Ebomegobius
 Echinogobius
 Economidichthys
 Egglestonichthys
 Ego
 Elacatinus
 Eleotrica
 Evermannia
 Eviota
 Exyrias
 Favonigobius
 Feia
 Fusigobius
 Gammogobius
 Ginsburgellus
 Gladiogobius
 Glossogobius
 Gobiodon
 Gobiopsis
 Gobiosoma 
 Gobius
 Gobiusculus
 Gobulus
 Gorogobius
 Grallenia
 Gymneleotris
 Hazeus
 Hetereleotris
 Heterogobius
 Heteroplopomus
 Hyrcanogobius
 Istigobius
 Kelloggella
 Knipowitschia
 Koumansetta
 Larsonella
 Lebetus
 Lesueurigobius
 Lobulogobius
 Lophiogobius
 Lophogobius
 Lotilia
 Lubricogobius
 Luposicya
 Lythrypnus
 Macrodontogobius
 Mahidolia
 Mangarinus
 Mauligobius
 Mesogobius
 Microgobius
 Minysicya
 Myersina
 Nematogobius
 Neogobius
 Nes 
 Nesogobius
 Obliquogobius
 Odondebuenia
 Ophiogobius
 Oplopomops
 Oplopomus
 Opua
 Padogobius
 Palatogobius
 Palutrus
 Parachaeturichthys
 Paragobiodon
 Paratrimma
 Pariah
 Parkraemeria
 Parrella
 Pascua
 Phoxacromion
 Phyllogobius
 Platygobiopsis 
 Pleurosicya
 Polyspondylogobius
 Pomatoschistus
 Ponticola
 Porogobius
 Priolepis
 Proterorhinus
 Psammogobius
 Pseudaphya
 Psilogobius
 Psilotris
 Pycnomma
 Rhinogobiops
 Risor
 Robinsichthys
 Signigobius
 Silhouettea
 Siphonogobius
 Speleogobius
 Stonogobiops
 Sueviota
 Sufflogobius
 Thorogobius
 Tigrigobius
 Tomiyamichthys
 Trimma
 Trimmatom
 Tryssogobius
 Valenciennea
 Vanderhorstia
 Vanneaugobius
 Varicus
 Vomerogobius	
 Wheelerigobius
 Yoga
 Yongeichthys
 Zebrus
 Zosterisessor

References

 
Gobiidae
Taxa named by Georges Cuvier